Patriotic soup (Teochew :hu gog chai) is a vegetable soup originated by Teochew people. It was developed during the final year of China's Song dynasty as an improvisational dish.

History
According to the locals at the Guangdong Province, prior to the Battle of Yamen, Song's last emperor Zhao Bing and his regime's remnants sought shelter in a monastery at Chaozhou. The monastery's monks served an impromptu vegetarian soup made of leaf vegetable, edible mushrooms, and vegetable broth. The emperor loved the soup and named it "protect the country dish". A later generation named it in English "patriotic soup". After Zhao Bing died, the preparation of the soup became a way to honor the last Song emperor.

Preparation
The soup became a part of Teochew cuisine, and its recipe evolved over time. Although the Chinese since the Ming dynasty commonly use sweet potato leaves, other varieties include amaranth, spinach, ipomoea aquatica and other leafy greens; and alternative broths such as beef or chicken. Other ingredients are often added such as beaten eggs, shredded dry cured ham, tofu, cellophane noodles, etc. Guangdong Province's restaurants routinely decorate the soup in a taijitu diagram. However, the most authentic version of the soup typically is homemade and simply prepared just using leaf vegetable, edible mushrooms, and vegetable broth.

See also

 List of soups
 List of vegetable soups
 Mulukhiyah
 Sorrel soup
 Spinach soup
 Watercress soup

References

Teochew cuisine
Vegetable soups
Chinese soups
Buddhist cuisine
Mushroom dishes